Šaunštejn Castle (German: Schauenstein, also Hohenleipaer Raubschloss) is a rock castle near Vysoká Lípa (Hohenleipa) in the Bohemian Switzerland in the Czech Republic. Today only a few ruins remain of the original castle. Preserved are the foundations of the wooden superstructure, several rooms that were chiselled-out of the rock and the cistern.

History 
The castle was built by the Berka of Dubá family from Lípa in the 14th century to protect the Old Bohemian Road (Alte Böhmerstraße), the trade route from Bohemia to Lusatia. From 1435 it belonged to the Wartenbergs who used it as a base for raids. In the 15th century it was besieged several times by the Wettins and the Lusatian League and finally destroyed.

Views 
In clear weather the view extends from the Kaltenberg, the Lausche, the Rosenberg, over the Hoher Schneeberg to the Ore Mountains.

See also 
List of castles in the Czech Republic

Sources 
 Richard Klos: Die sechs Felsenburgen in der Böhmischen Schweiz. In: Sächsische Heimatblätter Heft 3/1968, pp. 97–103

External links 
 Website for Šaunštejn Castle 

Bohemian Switzerland
Rock formations of the Czech Republic
Děčín District
Rock castles
Castles in the Ústí nad Labem Region
Tourist attractions in the Ústí nad Labem Region
Ruined castles in the Czech Republic